Tabora Deaf-Mute Institute founded in 1963 by the Roman Catholic Mission in Tabora, Tanzania. It was the first school for the deaf in Tanzania. 

Its programming is aimed at school-age children.

The building was designed by Dutch architect Antoni Folkers.

References 

Schools for the deaf
Buildings and structures in the Tabora Region
Special schools in Tanzania
1963 establishments in Tanganyika